INXS is the debut studio album by Australian rock band INXS. It was released on Deluxe Records in Australia on 13 October 1980. The band recorded the album in midnight to dawn sessions during 1979 to 1980 after performing, on average, two gigs a day at local pubs around Sydney. All tracks were credited to band members, Garry Gary Beers (bass guitar and double bass); brothers Andrew (keyboards and guitar), Jon (drums, keyboards) and Tim Farriss (lead guitar); Michael Hutchence (lead vocals); and Kirk Pengilly (guitar, saxophone and backing vocals). The album was co-produced by the band and Duncan McGuire (ex-Ayers Rock). It spawned the single, "Just Keep Walking" (September 1980), which became their first Australian Top 40 hit. INXS peaked in the Top 30 of the related Kent Music Report Albums Chart. The album did not appear internationally until 1984.

Background
INXS released their first single, "Simple Simon", in May 1980. The single had its debut TV performance on Simon Townsend's Wonder World. Their self-titled debut album, INXS, was recorded at Trafalgar Studios in Annandale, Sydney, it was co-produced by the band and Duncan McGuire (ex-Ayers Rock), with all songs attributed to the entire band. In 1977 INXS had formed with a line-up of Garry Gary Beers (bass guitar and double bass); brothers Andrew (keyboards and guitar), Jon (drums, keyboards) and Tim Farriss (lead guitar); Michael Hutchence (lead vocals); and Kirk Pengilly (guitar, saxophone and backing vocals).

INXS signed with Deluxe Records which gave them a budget of $10,000 to record the album, during 1979 to 1980 they recorded from midnight to dawn, usually after doing one or more performances earlier that night. The album was released by Deluxe on 13 October 1980. Later Hutchence recalled working on INXS:

Tim Farriss remarked that the lyric "Shove it, brother / Just keep walking" from the song "sort of summed up our attitude. We took on an 'angry young man' status because we were working our guts out and still starving."

INXS' early records demonstrated their new wave-ska-pop style, and were followed by near constant touring with almost 300 shows during 1981 as the band developed their status as a live act. Between touring commitments, the band released their third single in May 1981, "The Loved One", which was a cover of a 1966 song by Australian group The Loved Ones. This track was recorded at Studios 301 in Sydney, produced by Richard Clapton, and peaked in the Top 20.

Reception

AllMusic's Stephen Thomas Erlewine was not impressed by INXS "playing a competent but unremarkable variation on droning new wave synth pop" but noted that Hutchence "exuded a powerful vocal charisma".

Track listing

Charts

Personnel
INXS Members
Michael Hutchence – lead vocals
Tim Farriss – lead guitar
Kirk Pengilly – guitar, saxophone, backing vocals
Garry Gary Beers – bass guitar, double bass, backing vocals
Jon Farriss – drums, backing vocals
Andrew Farriss – keyboards, guitar

Production details
Producer – Duncan McGuire, INXS
Engineer – Duncan McGuire
Studios – Trafalgar Studios, Annandale, New South Wales
Mixing studio – A.T.A. Studios

Artwork
Cover art – Gecko Graphics, Noël Coward

Notes

INXS albums
1980 debut albums